Santa Rosa Church is a sanctuary church located in Florence in the region of Tuscany, Italy.

Rosa